The wedding of Albert Edward, Prince of Wales (later King Edward VII), and Princess Alexandra of Denmark (later Queen Alexandra) took place on 10 March 1863 at St. George's Chapel, Windsor Castle. It was the first royal wedding to take place at St. George's, and the last wedding of a prince of Wales until Prince Charles and Lady Diana Spencer's 1981 wedding. Albert Edward became King Edward VII in 1901.

Engagement 

Before his marriage, Prince Albert Edward, known as "Bertie" amongst his family, garnered a reputation as a philandering prince, and his irresponsibility was greatly detested by his parents, Queen Victoria and Albert, Prince Consort. They sought to put a stop to his affairs by means of marriage and thereby bring stability to his life. In 1858, the Queen and Prince Albert began the process of finding their son a suitable bride, preferable a German Protestant. The Prince's older sister, Victoria, Princess Royal (by then Crown Princess of Prussia), aided the Queen in drafting a list of potential brides, the fifth on the list being the thirteen-year-old Princess Alexandra of Denmark, the eldest daughter of Prince Christian of Schleswig-Holstein-Sonderburg-Beck (later King Christian IX of Denmark) and Louise of Hesse-Kassel. In the end, Bertie's father agreed on Alexandra, remarking that she was "the only one to be chosen." Prince Albert Edward and Princess Alexandra met on 24 September 1861 at Speyer Cathedral, Germany, an arrangement engineered by Princess Victoria.

On 14 December that year, Prince Albert died of typhoid, causing the Queen to enter a deep state of mourning. She blamed his death on their son and his promiscuous affairs, most recently with actress Nellie Clifden that caused a rift between Bertie and his father. Perhaps to appease his mother by following the late Prince Consort's wishes, Bertie proposed to Alexandra on their next meeting. They were engaged on 9 September 1862 at the Palace of Laeken, Belgium.

Princess Alexandra arrived in Britain abroad the royal yacht Victoria and Albert on 7 March 1863, just a few months after the engagement. She was received by large crowds as she landed in Gravesend, Kent. She joined the Prince of Wales on the royal train for the journey to London, where she was greeted by an anxious Queen Victoria.

Wedding 

The Queen decided that the ceremony would be held at St. George Chapel, Windsor, at the time an unusual location as royal weddings typically took place in London. The press complained that public spectators would not be able to view the event. Some people who might have expected invitations were disappointed that the event was planned to be small, and therefore they did not receive invitations. Only Princess Alexandra's close family were invited.

On the morning of 10 March 1863, the carriage procession began from Windsor Castle. The Danish royal family were first, followed by the British royal family members; the Prince of Wales and his entourage were in the next-to-last carriage, with the bride coming last. Queen Victoria was not part of the procession, being taken to the chapel privately. She was escorted by her brother-in-law, the Duke of Saxe-Coburg and Gotha; she was dressed in mourning, and viewed the ceremony from above and out of view of the other guests. The ceremony was conducted by Thomas Longley, the Archbishop of Canterbury.

Princess Alexandra was attended by eight bridesmaids Lady Diana Beauclerk, Victoria Montagu-Douglas-Scott, Victoria Howard, Elma Bruce, Agneta Yorke, Emily Villiers (filling in for Hariot Georgina Hamilton-Rowan who was indisposed that day), Eleanor Hare and Feodorowna Wellesley. She was supported by her father, Prince Christian, and by the Duke of Cambridge. The Prince of Wales was supported by his uncle, the Duke of Saxe-Coburg and Gotha, and brother-in-law, the Crown Prince of Prussia.

After the ceremony, the Prince and Princess of Wales returned to Windsor Castle along with the other guests. Many of the royal guests served as witnesses, with Queen Victoria, the Prince of Wales's siblings and their spouses, Princess Alexandra's family, as well as the Danish and British ministers and Lord Chancellor signing the marriage register. A banquet was held in the State Dining Room for the royal guests and in St. George's Hall for household members, and other guests. The couple honeymooned at Osborne House on the Isle of Wight.

Following her marriage, Princess Alexandra was styled Her Royal Highness The Princess of Wales.

Wedding dress 
The wedding dress of Princess Alexandra of Denmark was made by London dressmaker Mrs James of Belgravia, and was the first British royal wedding dress to be photographed while being worn.

Guests

Groom’s family 

 The Queen of the United Kingdom, the groom's mother
 The Crown Princess and Crown Prince of Prussia, the groom's sister and brother-in-law
 Prince Wilhelm of Prussia, the groom's nephew
 Princess and Prince Ludwig of Hesse and by Rhine, the groom's sister and brother-in-law
 The Princess Helena, the groom's sister
 The Princess Louise, the groom's sister
 The Prince Arthur, the groom's brother
 The Prince Leopold, the groom's brother
 The Princess Beatrice, the groom's sister
 The Duke of Saxe-Coburg and Gotha, the groom's paternal uncle
 The Duchess of Inverness, the groom's maternal grandaunt by marriage
 The Duchess of Cambridge, the groom's maternal grandaunt by marriage
 The Duke of Cambridge, the groom's maternal first cousin once removed
 Princess Mary Adelaide of Cambridge, the groom's maternal first cousin once removed
 The Prince of Leiningen, the groom's maternal first half-cousin
 Prince and Princess Victor of Hohenlohe-Langenburg, the groom's maternal first half-cousin and his wife
 The Duchess of Brabant,  wife of the groom's double first cousin once removed
 The Count of Flanders, the groom's double first cousin once removed
 Prince August of Saxe-Coburg and Gotha, the groom's double first cousin once removed

Bride's family 

 Prince and Princess Christian of Denmark, the bride's parents
 Prince Frederik of Denmark, the bride's brother
 Prince Wilhelm of Denmark, the bride's brother
 Princess Dagmar of Denmark, the bride's sister
 Princess Thyra of Denmark, the bride's sister
 The Duke of Schleswig-Holstein-Sonderburg-Glücksburg, the bride's paternal uncle
 Prince Frederick William of Hesse-Kassel, the bride's maternal uncle

Other royals 

 Prince Edward of Saxe-Weimar
 Maharaja Sir Duleep Singh

Foreign ambassadors 
 The Ottoman Ambassador and Madame Mousouros
 The Austrian Ambassador and Countess Apponyi
 The Russian Ambassador and Baroness von Brunnow
 The Prussian Ambassador and Countess von Bernstorff
 The French Ambassador
 The Belgian Minister and Madame Van De Weyer
 The Bavarian Minister
 The Hanoverian Minister
 The Italian Minister
 The Dutch Minister
 The Portuguese Minister
 The Brazilian Minister and Madame Moreira
 The Saxon Minster
 The Danish Minister
 The Honduran Minister
 The United States Minister and Mrs. Adams
 The Swedish Minister
 The Spanish Minister
 The Peruvian Minister
 The Persian Minister
 The Greek Chargé d'affaires
 The Haitian Chargé d'affaires

Royal Household 

 The Lord Steward
 The Lord Chamberlain and the Viscountess Sidney
 The Master of the Horse and the Marchioness of Ailesbury
 The Mistress of the Robes
 The Treasurer of the Household and Viscountess Bury
 The Comptroller of the Household and Lady Proby
 The Vice Chamberlain and Viscountess Castlerosse
 The Captain of the Yeomen of the Guard and the Countess of Ducie
 The Gold Stick in Waiting and Viscountess Combermere
 The Keeper of the Privy Purse and the Hon. Lady Phipps
 The Master of the Buckhounds and the Countess of Bessborough
 The Deputy Earl Marshall
 The Master of the Household and the Hon. Mrs. Biddulph
 The Lord in Waiting
 The Groom in Waiting
 The Clerk Marshal
 The Groom of the Stool and the Countess Spencer
 The Lord Chamberlain to the Princess of Wales

Clergy 
 The Archbishop of Canterbury
 The Bishop of London and Catharine Tait
 The Bishop of Winchester
 The Bishop of Oxford
 The Bishop of Chester and Mrs. Graham
 The Dean of Windsor and the Hon. Mrs. Wellesley

Politicians 

 The Lord High Chancellor
 The Lord President of the Council
 The Lord Privy Seal and the Duchess of Argyll
 The Prime Minister and First Lord of the Treasury, and the Viscountess Palmerston
 The Chancellor of the Exchequer and Mrs Gladstone
 The Secretary of State for Foreign Affairs and the Countess Russell
 The Secretary of State for the Colonies
 The Secretary of State for the Home Department and Lady Grey
 The Secretary of State for India and Lady Mary Wood
 The Secretary of State for War
 The First Lord of the Admiralty and the Duchess of Somerset
 The President of the Board of Trade
 The Postmaster General and the Lady Stanley of Alderley
 The Chancellor of the Duchy of Lancaster and Mrs. Cardwell
 The President of the Poor Law Board
 The First Commissioner of Works and the Hon. Mrs. William Cooper
 The Vice-President of the Committee of the Council on Education and Mrs. Lowe
 The Vice-President of the Board of Trade and Mrs. Hutt
 The Chief Secretary for Ireland
 The Speaker of the House of Commons and Lady Charlotte Denison
 The Lord Chief Justice of the Queen's Bench
 The Judge Advocate General and Mrs. Headlam
 The Adjutant General
 The Quartermaster General
 The Lord Mayor and Lord Mayoress of London
 The Gentleman Usher of the Black Rod
 Mr and Mrs. Benjamin Disraeli

Nobles 
 The Duke and Duchess of Buccleuch
 The Duke of Devonshire
 The Duke of St Albans
 The Dowager Duchess of Sutherland
 The Duke and Duchess of Atholl
 The Marquess and Marchioness of Carmarthen
 The Marquess and Marchioness of Salisbury
 The Marquess Camden
 The Marquess and Marchioness of Abercorn
 Viscount Hamilton
 The Marquess and Marchioness of Westminster
 The Marchioness of Ely
 The Dowager Countess of Mount Edgcumbe
 The Earl and Countess of Mount Edgcumbe
 The Earl and Countess of Clarendon
 The Earl and Countess of Suffolk
 The Earl and Countess of Hardwicke
 The Earl and Countess Cowley
 The Earl and Countess of Macclesfield
 The Earl and Countess of Morton
 The Earl and Countess de Grey and Ripon
 The Earl of Carlisle
 The Earl of Harrowby
 The Countess of Derby
 The Earl and Countess of Shaftesbury
 The Earl and Countess Fitzwilliam
 The Earl and Countess De La Warr
 The Earl and Countess of Caithness
 The Viscount and Viscountess Falkland
 The Countess of Dysart
 Viscount Hinchingbrooke
 Viscountess Jocelyn
 Viscountess Chewton
 Viscountess Forbes
 Viscount and Viscountess Torrington
 The Lord Portman
 The Lord and Lady Churchill
 The Dowager Lady Lyttelton
 The Lord and Lady Camoys
 The Lord Rivers
 The Lord Methuen
 The Lord and Lady de Tabley
 The Lord and Lady Cremorne
 The Lady Byron
 Lord and Lady Alfred Harvey
 Lord Charles FitzRoy
 Francis and Lady Emily Seymour
 The Hon. Dudley and Lady Elizabet de Ros
 Sir William Alexander, 3rd Baronet
 Sir Alexander Cornewall Duff-Gordon, 3rd Baronet
 Sir William Dunbar, 7th Baronet and Lady Dunbar
 Sir James Clark, 1st Baronet
 The Garter Principal King of Arms

References

Bibliography 

 

Albert Edward, Prince of Wales, and Princess Alexandra of Denmark
Windsor Castle
Edward VII
Alexandra of Denmark
Albert Edward, Prince of Wales, and Princess Alexandra of Denmark
Marriage, unions and partnerships in England
1863 in England